Sweden participated in the Junior Eurovision Song Contest 2007, held in Rotterdam, the Netherlands, with their entry organised by broadcaster TV4. TV4 held a national final Stage Junior 2007 to select the Swedish entry for the contest, which was held on 31 August 2007.

Before Junior Eurovision

Stage Junior 2007 
Stage Junior 2007, TV4's national selection for the Junior Eurovision Song Contest, was held at the Vasateatern in Stockholm on 31 August 2007, hosted by singer Agneta Sjödin and comedian Adam Alsing, the hosts of last year's contest. Eight songs competed to become the fifth Swedish entry to the Junior Eurovision Song Contest, with televoting and SMS voting deciding the final winner. Performances were made by last year's Swedish entry Molly Sandén and Carola, winner of the Eurovision Song Contest 1991. The final winner was Frida Sandén, sister of Molly Sandén, with the song "Nu eller aldrig", who beat 2 Times 2 by just 1% of the votes. Only the top three songs were announced, with Frida Sandén winning the contest as the favourite, receiving 16.5% of the votes for her performance of "Nu eller aldrig".

At Junior Eurovision
On the night of the contest, held in Rotterdam, the Netherlands, Frida Sandén performed 13th in the running order of the contest, following Ukraine and preceding Malta. At the close of the voting Frida received 83 points, placing 8th of the 17 competing entries.

Voting

Notes

References

Junior Eurovision Song Contest
Sweden
2007